Courtney Melba Barnett (born 3 November 1987) is an Australian singer, songwriter, and musician. Known for her deadpan singing style and witty, rambling lyrics, she attracted attention with the release of her debut EP I've Got a Friend Called Emily Ferris in 2012. International interest came with the release of her EP The Double EP: A Sea of Split Peas in 2013.

Barnett's debut album, Sometimes I Sit and Think, and Sometimes I Just Sit, was released in 2015 to widespread acclaim. At the 2015 ARIA Music Awards, she won four awards from eight nominations. She was nominated for Best New Artist at the 58th Annual Grammy Awards and International Female Solo Artist at the 2016 Brit Awards. She released Lotta Sea Lice, a collaborative album with Kurt Vile, in 2017. She released her second album, Tell Me How You Really Feel, to further acclaim in 2018. Barnett's third studio album Things Take Time, Take Time was released in November 2021.

Early life
Courtney Melba Barnett was born in Sydney on 3 November 1987. She was given her middle name after opera singer Nellie Melba. She grew up in Sydney's Northern Beaches area. Her mother was a ballerina. When she was 16, her family moved to Hobart. She attended St Michael's Collegiate School and the Tasmanian School of Art. Having grown up listening to American bands, she discovered Australian singer-songwriters Darren Hanlon and Dan Kelly, who inspired her to start writing songs. While pursuing a music career, she worked as a pizza delivery driver.

Career

From 2010 to 2011, Barnett played second guitar in Melbourne grunge band Rapid Transit. They released one self-titled album on cassette, which is a rare collector's item. She recorded many early versions of her songs with a band called Courtney Barnett and the Olivettes, which was later shortened to the Olivettes. They released a live EP demo CD, with 100 copies being produced which were hand numbered. Around this time Barnett featured on a track by Melbourne singer-songwriter Giles Field called "I Can't Hear You, We're Breaking Up" which was released in late 2011. She also has a credit as co-writer on the song.

Between 2011 and 2013, Barnett was a member of Australian psych-country band Immigrant Union, a musical project founded by Brent DeBoer (of The Dandy Warhols) and Bob Harrow. Along with sharing vocal duties, Barnett predominantly played slide guitar and is on the band's second studio album, Anyway. DeBoer played drums on Barnett's first EP, I've Got a Friend called Emily Ferris. It appeared in 2012 on Barnett's own label, Milk! Records.

In 2013, Barnett played lead guitar on Jen Cloher's third studio album, In Blood Memory, which was also released on Milk! Records. Following the release of her first EP, Barnett signed to Marathon Artists (via its imprint House Anxiety). In August 2013, Marathon Artists released The Double EP: A Sea of Split Peas, a combined package of Barnett's first EP and her second EP, How to Carve a Carrot Into a Rose. The Double EP brought Barnett international critical acclaim, with "Avant Gardener", the lead single, named Track of the Day by Q Magazine and Best New Track by Pitchfork in 2013. It was named the album of the week by Stereogum The track "History Eraser" was nominated for the APRA Song of the Year. How to Carve a Carrot into a Rose was released on a limited run by Milk! Records as a standalone EP in October 2013. Marathon Artists and House Anxiety partnered with Mom + Pop Music for the U.S. release of The Double EP in 2014.

Milk! Records released a compilation EP, A Pair of Pears (with Shadows), on 10" white vinyl in September 2014, following a crowd-sourcing campaign in July that year. The EP included a Barnett track, "Pickles from the Jar", the song was voted in at number 51 in Triple J's Hottest 100 for 2014.

On 30 January 2015, Barnett released details on her upcoming full-length album, recorded in April 2014 with Burke Reid, along with two singles, "Pedestrian at Best" and "Depreston" and accompanying music videos. The music video for "Pedestrian at Best" features Cloher and Fraser A Gorman. Her debut album, Sometimes I Sit and Think, and Sometimes I Just Sit, was released worldwide via Milk! Records (Australia), and Mom + Pop Music (US) on 23 March 2015, and was accompanied by tours in the UK and Europe, America, and Australasia.

Sometimes I Sit and Think was met with critical acclaim, The Times, Pitchfork and the Chicago Tribune. Up until the release of Sometimes I Sit and Think, and Sometimes I Just Sit, Courtney Barnett, Bones Sloane, and Dave Mudie toured as Courtney Barnett and the Courtney Barnetts.

In August 2015, Barnett's UK label, Marathon Artists, in partnership with Mom + Pop Music and Milk! Records, launched a global guerilla campaign for the release of her single "Nobody Really Cares If You Don't Go to the Party". Billboards and posters bearing the song's title went up in London, New York, Los Angeles, Melbourne and Sydney. The campaign garnered a lot of interest online and across social media and culminated in a surprise busking gig in Camden, London.

In concert, Dan Luscombe (of The Drones) has often played lead guitar and keyboards, having featured on both, How to Carve a Carrot Into a Rose and Sometimes I Sit and Think, and Sometimes I Just Sit, the latter of which he co-produced. When Luscombe was not available, the band performed as a trio, with Barnett playing guitar. Luscombe did not play on Barnett's 2015 tours, however, and she now refers to the band as the "CB3" on her Facebook page. The CB3 moniker features prominently on drummer Dave Mudie's bass drum.

Barnett was nominated in eight categories at the ARIA Music Awards of 2015, and won four trophies: Breakthrough Artist, Best Female Artist, Best Independent Release and Best Cover Art for Sometimes I Sit and Think, and Sometimes I Just Sit. At the end of 2015, Barnett was nominated for a Grammy Award in the Best New Artist category. She was later nominated for Best International Female in 2016 for the Brit awards. On 21 May 2016, she was the musical guest on the season finale of Saturday Night Lives 41st season, hosted by Fred Armisen. In January 2016, Barnett appeared on the cover of Australian music magazine, Happy Mag. On 27 May 2016, she was the musical guest on The Tonight Show Starring Jimmy Fallon.

In 2017, Barnett and Kurt Vile recorded the collaborative album Lotta Sea Lice, released via Matador Records, Marathon Artists and Milk! Records on October 13. Some of the album collaborators include Stella Mozgawa, Mick Harvey and the Dirty Three's Mick Turner and Jim White. The lead single "Over Everything" was released on August 30, 2017 accompanied by the music video directed by Danny Cohen. "Over Everything" initially sparked the pair's collaboration, after Philadelphia-based Vile wrote the song with the Melbourne-based Barnett's voice in mind. The second single "Continental Breakfast" was released on 26 September 2017. In June 2017 Vile and Barnett announced a North American tour. The duo was backed by the Sea Lice, a band featuring Janet Weiss (Sleater-Kinney, Wild Flag), Rob Laakso (The Violators, Swirlies, Mice Parade), Stella Mozgawa (Warpaint), and Katie Harkin (Sky Larkin, touring member of Sleater-Kinney and Wild Beasts).

On 12 February 2018, Barnett teased a new album on her social media accounts, featuring her trying out various musical instruments with the clip ending with the tagline "Tell Me How You Really Feel". Barnett released the singles "Nameless, Faceless", "Need A Little Time", "City Looks Pretty", and "Sunday Roast" from her sophomore solo album, which was launched at a private function at Sydney's Lansdowne Hotel in April 2018 and emceed by ex-The Go-Betweens Lindy Morrison. The album was eventually released on 18 May 2018 and titled Tell Me How You Really Feel. The album dealt, in part, with Barnett's thoughts about isolation in the social media age. "City Looks Pretty" was featured on the soundtrack of the video game FIFA 19.

In 2019, Barnett was added to the bill of Woodstock 50, but the festival was cancelled in May.

In December 2020, NME reported that a documentary titled Anonymous Club exploring "the inner life of the notoriously shy [Barnett] amidst her significant rise to fame" is in the works after receiving $2.5 million in funding from Screen Australia.

On 7 July 2021, Barnett released "Rae Street", the lead single from her third studio album, Things Take Time, Take Time, which was released on 12 November 2021.

On 3 July 2022. Barnett supported the Rolling Stones at their concert at Hyde Park in London, UK.

Equipment and playing style 
Barnett plays left-handed, using mostly left-handed guitars with standard tuning and string order for left-handed players (low strings at the top, high strings at the bottom). She occasionally plays right-handed guitars flipped upside down, but does not prefer it. She learned to play on acoustic guitars, and developed her own method of fingerstyle guitar because she disliked the sound of a pick; she later transferred this playing style to the electric guitar. She is capable of using a pick and claims she could probably play better with one, but prefers to play using her fingers, strumming with both her thumb and index finger on rhythm parts and using her index finger where she would otherwise use a pick for lead parts. She prefers to play in standard tuning, but has used open G tuning for slide guitar.

Among the guitars Barnett has used for performance and recording are a Harmony H59 and a number of Fenders, including Jaguars, Stratocasters, and Telecasters, which she strings with Ernie Ball Power Slinky strings in the 0.011−0.048 gauge. She plays through Fender Hot Rod Deville and Fender Deluxe amplifiers, with effects pedals including a Fulltone OCD overdrive pedal, a "cheap delay pedal", and a chorus pedal.

Personal life
Barnett was in a relationship with fellow musician Jen Cloher from 2012 to 2018, and the song "Numbers" was co-written by the pair about their relationship. Barnett's song "Pickles from the Jar" also details their relationship, and Cloher is mentioned in the first line of "Dead Fox". Barnett called Cloher a "huge constant influence" on her music. She also played guitar in Cloher's band from 2012 to 2018.

Backing band members

Current
 Bones Sloane – bass, backing vocals (2013–present)
 Dave Mudie – drums, percussion, backing vocals (2013–present)

Former
 Alex Hamilton – guitar, backing vocals (2012–2013)
 Pete Convery – bass (2012–2013)
 Dan Luscombe – guitar, keyboard, backing vocals (2013–2014; session/touring member 2017)

Session/touring
 Katie Harkin – guitar, keyboard, backing vocals (2018)
 Lucy Waldron – cello, backing vocals (2019–present)
 Stella Mozgawa – drums, percussion, keyboard (2021–present)

Discography

 Sometimes I Sit and Think, and Sometimes I Just Sit (2015)
 Tell Me How You Really Feel (2018)
 Things Take Time, Take Time (2021)

Awards and nominations

AIR Awards
The Australian Independent Record Awards (commonly known informally as AIR Awards) is an annual awards night to recognise, promote and celebrate the success of Australia's Independent Music sector.

|-
| rowspan="2" | AIR Awards of 2013
|Courtney Barnett
| Breakthrough Independent Artist
| 
|-
| "History Eraser"
| Best Independent Single/EP
| 
|-
| rowspan="2" | AIR Awards of 2014
|Courtney Barnett
| Best Independent Artist
| 
|-
| "Avant Gardener"
| Best Independent Single/EP
| 
|-
| rowspan="4" | AIR Awards of 2015
|Courtney Barnett
| Best Independent Artist
| 
|-
| Sometimes I Sit and Think, and Sometimes I Just Sit
| Best Independent Album
| 
|-
| "Depreston"
| rowspan="2" | Best Independent Single/EP
| 
|-
| "Pedestrian At Best"
| 
|-
| rowspan="3" | AIR Awards of 2019 
| Courtney Barnett 
| Best Independent Artist
| 
|-
| Tell Me How You Really Feel 
| Best Independent Album or EP
| 
|-
| "Nameless, Faceless"
| Best Independent Single or EP
| 
|-
| rowspan="2"| AIR Awards of 2022
| rowspan="2"| Things Take Time, Take Time
| Independent Album of the Year
|  
|-
| Best Independent Rock Album or EP
|

APRA Music Awards
The APRA Awards are presented annually from 1982 by the Australasian Performing Right Association (APRA), "honouring composers and songwriters".

ARIA Music Awards
The ARIA Music Awards is an annual awards ceremony that recognises excellence, innovation, and achievement across all genres of Australian music. Barnett has won 6 ARIA Music Awards from 20 nominations.

Australian Music Prize
The Australian Music Prize (the AMP) is an annual award of $30,000 given to an Australian band or solo artist in recognition of the merit of an album released during the year of award. The commenced in 2005.

|-
| 2015
| Sometimes I Sit and Think, and Sometimes I Just Sit
| Australian Music Prize
| 
|-
| 2018
| Tell Me How You Really Feel
| Australian Music Prize
| 
|-

Brit Awards

Grammy Awards

J Award
The J Awards are an annual series of Australian music awards that were established by the Australian Broadcasting Corporation's youth-focused radio station Triple J. They commenced in 2005.

! 
|-
| rowspan="2"| 2015
| Sometimes I Sit and Think, and Sometimes I Just Sit
| Australian Album of the Year
| 
| rowspan="2"| 
|-
| "Pedestrian at Best"
| Australian Video of the Year
| 
|-
| 2016
| "Elevator Operator"
| Australian Video of the Year
| 
| 
|-
| 2018
| Tell Me How You Really Feel
| Australian Album of the Year
| 
| 
|-
| 2022
| Courtney Barnett 
| Double J Artist of the Year
| 
|

Libera Awards
The Libera Awards are an annual awards ceremony presented by the American Association of Independent Music (A2IM) to celebrate excellence i independent music.

|-
| rowspan="3" | 2016
|rowspan="3"|Sometimes I Sit and Think, and Sometimes I Just Sit
| Album of the Year
| 
|-
| Best Breakthrough Artist
| 
|-
| Groundbreaking Album of the Year
| 
|-
|2019
|Tell Me How You Really Feel
| Best Rock Album
| 
|-
|2022
|Things Take Time, Take Time
| Best Alternative Rock Album
| 
|-

Music Victoria Awards
The Music Victoria Awards, are an annual awards night celebrating Victorian music. They commenced in 2005.

|-
| rowspan="2"| 2012
| herself
| Best Female Artist
| 
|-
| herself
| Best New Artist
| 
|-
| rowspan="2"| 2013
| herself
| Best Female Artist
| 
|-
| "History Eraser"
| Best Song
| 
|-
| rowspan="2"| 2014
| herself
| Best Female Artist
| 
|-
| "Avant Gardener"
| Best Song
| 
|-
| rowspan="5"| 2015
| herself
| Best Female Artist
| 
|-
| herself
| Best Band
| 
|-
| "Pedestrian at Best"
| rowspan="2"| Best Song
| 
|-
| "Depreston"
| 
|-
| Sometimes I Sit and Think and Sometimes I Just Sit
| Best Album
| 
|-
| rowspan="5"| 2018
| herself
| Best Female Musician
| 
|-
| herself
| Best Solo Artists
| 
|-
| herself
| Best Live Act
| 
|-
| "Nameless, Faceless"
| Best Song
| 
|-
| Tell Me How You Really Feel
| Best Album
| 
|-
| rowspan="2"| 2019
| herself
| Best Female Musician
| 
|-
| herself
| Best Solo Artist
| 
|-
| 2020
| herself
| Best Solo Artist
| 
|-
| 2022
| "Rae Street"
| Best Victorian Song
| 
|-

National Live Music Awards
The National Live Music Awards (NLMAs) are a broad recognition of Australia's diverse live industry, celebrating the success of the Australian live scene. The awards commenced in 2016.

|-
| National Live Music Awards of 2016
| herself
| International Live Achievement (Solo)
| 
|-
| National Live Music Awards of 2017
| herself
| Best Live Voice of the Year - People's Choice
| 
|-
| National Live Music Awards of 2018
| herself
| International Live Achievement (Solo)
| 
|-
| National Live Music Awards of 2020
| herself
| Live Guitarist of the Year
| 
|-

Rolling Stone Australia Awards
The Rolling Stone Australia Awards are awarded annually in January or February by the Australian edition of Rolling Stone magazine for outstanding contributions to popular culture in the previous year.

! 
|-
| 2023
| "Rae Street"
| Best Single
| 
| 
|-

Sweden GAFFA Awards
Delivered since 2010, the GAFFA Awards (Swedish: GAFFA Priset) are a Swedish award that rewards popular music awarded by the magazine of the same name.

!
|-
| rowspan="2"| 2019
| Herself
| Best Foreign Solo Act
| 
| style="text-align:center;" rowspan="2"|
|-
| Tell Me How You Really Feel
| Best Foreign Album
| 
|-
|}

See also
 List of musicians who play left-handed

References

External links

 
 

1987 births
Living people
Alternative rock guitarists
Alternative rock singers
APRA Award winners
ARIA Award winners
Australian women guitarists
Australian women singer-songwriters
Australian indie rock musicians
Australian rock guitarists
Australian lesbian musicians
Australian LGBT singers
Australian LGBT songwriters
Lesbian singers
Lesbian songwriters
Musicians from Melbourne
21st-century Australian women singers
21st-century guitarists
Immigrant Union members
Mom + Pop Music artists
Matador Records artists
20th-century Australian LGBT people
21st-century Australian LGBT people
21st-century women guitarists